Hitler and Stalin: Parallel Lives is a 1991 book by the historian Alan Bullock, in which the author puts the German dictator Adolf Hitler in perspective with the Soviet dictator Joseph Stalin. 

Bullock had already written a celebrated biography of Hitler in 1952 (Hitler: A Study in Tyranny). In Hitler and Stalin, he analyses the inner doctrines that made victory and unparalleled terror possible. While analyzing the lives of Hitler and Stalin, he prompts the reader with the importance of the German-Russian axis in the first half of the century. 

The title and structure of the book refer to the ancient Greek writer Plutarch and his Parallel Lives.

References

External links 
 At Google Books
 Hitler And Stalin: Parallel Lives Reviewed by Fritz Stern
 Commentary Magazine
 Global Source Summaries & Reviews

1991 non-fiction books
Books about Adolf Hitler
Books about Joseph Stalin
Books by Alan Bullock
English-language books
HarperCollins books